Benjamin Kirk Hardy (born 21 September 1974) is an Australian former volleyball player.

Career
Hardy played for Australia's volleyball team at the 2000 Olympics. He was a captain of Australian national team. He won a gold medal at the 2007 Asian Men's Volleyball Championship. He ended his sport career in 2011.

Achievements

Club
 1998/1998  Australian Volleyball League Championship, with AIS
 2004/2005  Belgium Cup, with Knack Randstad Roeselare
 2004/2005  Belgium Championship, with Knack Randstad Roeselare
 2005/2006  Belgium Cup, with Knack Randstad Roeselare
 2005/2006  Belgium Championship, with Knack Randstad Roeselare
 2006/2007  Belgium Championship, with Knack Randstad Roeselare
 2007/2008  Belgium Championship, with Knack Randstad Roeselare
 2009/2010  Polish Championship, with Jastrzębski Węgiel
 2009/2010  Polish Championship, with Jastrzębski Węgiel
 2011/2012  Australian Championship, with Canberra Heat
 2013/2014  Australian Championship, with Canberra Heat

International

Asian Championships:
  1999 Iran
  2001 South Korea
  2007 Indonesia

References

External links
 PlusLiga player profile

1974 births
Living people
Australian men's volleyball players
Jastrzębski Węgiel players
Sportspeople from Sydney
Volleyball players at the 2000 Summer Olympics
Olympic volleyball players of Australia
Expatriate volleyball players in Poland
Australian expatriate sportspeople in Poland
Volleyball players at the 2004 Summer Olympics
ACT Academy of Sport alumni